The Molyneux Chevrolet Company Building, also known as the Rockwood Fire Department Building, is a historic building in Rockwood, Tennessee. It was built in 1927 and listed on the National Register of Historic Places in 2002.

It is an L-shaped two part commercial building. It was made of poured concrete walls, with concrete made by forms in a block-like pattern.  It has decorative concrete pilasters.  It was built to hold a flat-roofed fire hall in one bay on the eastern side, and the Molyneux Chevrolet Company in three other bays covered by a hipped roof.

The building still existed in 2011.

References

Fire stations on the National Register of Historic Places in Tennessee
National Register of Historic Places in Roane County, Tennessee
Buildings and structures completed in 1927